Ashim Krishna Dutt was an Indian politician. He was a Member of Parliament, representing Calcutta South West in the Lok  Sabha, the lower house of India's Parliament representing the Indian National Congress.

References

External links
Official biographical sketch in Parliament of India website

Lok Sabha members from West Bengal
Indian National Congress politicians
1892 births
Year of death missing